The Simpsons: Hit & Run is a 2003 action-adventure game developed by Radical Entertainment and published by Vivendi Universal Games. It is based on the American animated sitcom The Simpsons, and is the twenty-second installment in the Simpsons series of video games.  

The game follows the Simpson family and their friend Apu Nahasapeemapetilon as they witness many strange incidents that occur in Springfield; security cameras, mysterious vans, crop circles, and a "new and improved" flavor of the popular soft drink Buzz Cola that causes insanity. Taking matters into their own hands, they discover numerous shocking secrets, and soon realize these incidents are part of a larger alien conspiracy, caused by Kang and Kodos. The gameplay largely focuses on exploration and missions; players often race enemies and interact with supporting characters on timed quests. The game also features many elements found in role-playing games, such as explorable worlds and side tasks. 

Development of The Simpsons: Hit & Run began in late 2001 as a spiritual successor to Radical Entertainment's previous game The Simpsons: Road Rage. Production was extensive, as the team sought to differentiate the game from Road Rage, deeming that their new entry in the franchise required a different direction. The game was heavily inspired by the Grand Theft Auto series, and the development team re-purposed the open-world design and nuanced character development for the game. This encouraged collaboration with the show's writers and cast, who helped to craft the story and dialogue. It was released in September 2003 for the GameCube, PlayStation 2, and Xbox. It was then ported to Microsoft Windows two months later.

Upon release, it received positive reviews from video game critics, with praise particularly focused on the interpretation of The Simpsons television series as a video game, its parodical take on Grand Theft Auto III, and graphics, while criticism mostly surrounded some aspects of gameplay, such as bugs and glitches. It is often considered to be the best Simpsons tie-in game and has gained a cult following. The game was also a commercial success, with recorded sales of over 3 million worldwide by July 2007. It received the award for Fave Video Game at the 2004 Nickelodeon Australian Kids' Choice Awards. On the PlayStation 2, GameCube, and Xbox, it earned Greatest Hits, Player's Choice, and Platinum Hits respectively.

Gameplay

The Simpsons: Hit & Run features seven levels over three separate maps, each with missions and a sub-plot. The player can control one specific character in each level. The game's playable characters are Homer (played twice), Bart (played twice), Lisa, Marge, and Apu. When travelling on foot, the player character can walk, jump, run, and perform three types of melee attacks: a normal kick, a jumping kick, and a smashing move. To drive, the player can either hitchhike and control the driver in one of the many civilian vehicles that drive endlessly around town, or use a phone booth to select a car.  Several hidden vehicles are present in each level and can also be used by the player if found. The game's driving missions are also similar to those of Grand Theft Auto III. In both games, the player races against other characters, collects items before a timer runs out, and wrecks other cars.

The game has a sandbox-style format that emphasizes driving, and the player controls their character from a third-person view. The character can perform certain acts of violence, punching, such as attacking pedestrians, blowing up vehicles, and destroying the environment. The Simpsons: Hit & Run has a warning meter that indicates when the police will retaliate for bad behavior. Located in the bottom-right corner of the screen, the circular "hit and run" meter fills up when the character runs people over or destroys objects, and decreases when they cease doing so. When full, several police cars chase the character for the duration of the hit and run.

Each level contains items the player can collect, such as coins, which can be gathered by either smashing Buzz Cola vending machines, Buzz Cola boxes or wasp cameras, the latter of which become more elusive as the game progresses. The coins can be used to buy new cars and player outfits, some of which are required to progress through the game. The player can also collect Itchy and Scratchy cards, with seven cards hidden in each level. When the player collects all seven cards in a level, they will unlock one of seven tracks for the 'Bonus Game' racing mini-game. When all 49 cards are collected in all the levels, the player unlocks a special The Itchy & Scratchy Show video. Several events cause the player to lose coins; because the character cannot die, injuries cause the player to lose coins. If the player is apprehended during a hit and run, they will be fined 50 coins.

Plot
Mysterious happenings are occurring in Springfield; a horde of robot wasps descend upon the city, a "new and improved" brand of Buzz Cola is launched by television personality Krusty the Clown and introduced to store shelves, and black vans begin appearing around town. Homer suspects that a black van that is outside his house is spying on his family, and he takes it upon himself to investigate who it belongs to, with the van eventually stopping in front of Mr. Burns' mansion. After helping Marge destroy numerous copies of Bonestorm 2, Homer accuses Burns of spying on Springfield, to which Burns reveals to Homer that the black vans were simply pizza vans and fires Homer for the accusation.

The next day, Bart tries to get a copy of Bonestorm 2, only to find that the game is sold out. After doing odd chores in the hopes of finding a copy, Bart eventually learns that Professor Frink is using many copies of video games to help power the Truckasaurus, and Bart agrees to help him build it, as well as set up a safe environment for it to operate in. After escaping Truckasaurus' wrath, a tractor beam abducts Bart outside the stadium. Lisa attempts to find her brother by exploring the town for clues. She learns that black sedans which have been appearing around town are connected to Bart's disappearance. Lisa eventually finds Bart on a ship in Springfield harbor. He appears to have memory loss and is mumbling unintelligibly while occasionally mentioning the sedans and cola.

Marge sets out to learn what has affected Bart in hope of curing him, and investigates a crop circle that recently appeared in Cletus Spuckler's crop field. While Grampa describes the look of a crop circle, Marge realizes that his description is reminiscent of the Buzz Cola logo. Marge shows a can of the cola to Bart, which snaps him out of his stupor. Bart reveals that Buzz Cola is a mind-control cola produced by aliens to make the townspeople insane. Marge decides to purge Springfield of the cola, but in spite of her valiant efforts, the drink still maintains its presence and popularity.

Wracked with guilt upon realizing that he was selling a tainted product, Apu sets out to redeem himself and discover who owns the cola trucks that are supplying Buzz Cola around town. After helping Snake Jailbird with his community service, Apu learns that the cola trucks are registered to the Springfield Museum of Natural History. After acquiring the key from the museum curator, Apu and Bart visit the museum, where they find a meteor as the source of the cola. After destroying the meteor, they eavesdrop on a conversation between aliens Kang and Kodos, who are masterminding a scheme. Apu and Bart learn that the wasp cameras are filming the antics of Springfield for Kang and Kodos' struggling intergalactic reality show, Foolish Earthlings. The aliens intend to attract many viewers to their show by spreading the cola into the town's water supply and distributing laser guns among the populace to drive the town to a violent massacre.

Apu is too frightened of the aliens to help any further, so Bart asks Krusty for help to foil Kang and Kodos' plan, but Krusty does not believe Bart. Once Bart gets proof of a functional laser gun, Krusty informs Bart that he has already helped the Duff Brewery set up free laser gun stands around Springfield, which Bart promptly destroys. Bart then informs Homer of the aliens' plot, and the duo quickly pursue Kang and Kodos to the brewery in Homer's old sports car. However, the aliens escape after revealing that they have already released the cola throughout Springfield's water supply. As the cola seeps into the ground, it releases the undead from the Springfield Cemetery, who invade Springfield on the night of Halloween. 

After Homer collects supplies to protect his family and home from the marauding zombies, he decides to pursue an alien probe vehicle to the Springfield Nuclear Power Plant. Upon reaching the power plant, he encounters Frink, who has figured out the aliens' weakness: nuclear waste. He plans to use the space ship's tractor beam to suck up cars that are loaded with drums of nuclear waste, which has situated itself over the Springfield Elementary School playground. After successfully loading Frink's car into the space ship, Homer gets permission from Burns to take nuclear waste drums from the power plant to use against the aliens. After loading three more vehicles with nuclear payloads into the space ship, including sacrificing Snake and Grampa, the ship crashes down, killing Kang and Kodos.

The following day, Springfield is returned to normal, while the Foolish Earthlings finale reaches peak popularity even on Earth. Homer is hailed as a hero and gained a large following of alien fans that visit him. Kang and Kodos are annoyed that they went to Earth heaven, and Kang screams in horror and frustration upon learning that they have to watch the game's credits.

Development
The developer, Radical Entertainment, received the rights to create games for The Simpsons franchise when they demonstrated a playable prototype. Radical released its first The Simpsons game in 2001, called The Simpsons: Road Rage. After Road Rage was released, the development team for Hit & Run decided not to create a direct sequel to Road Rage; instead, Radical wanted to steer the franchise's video game series in a different direction by giving the game engine a complete overhaul. The developers felt that everything else needed a new approach, while only the driving portion of Road Rage was worth keeping; in Hit & Run, enhanced traffic artificial intelligence is introduced, which makes computer-controlled vehicles react better to the player's driving. The internal development name for The Simpsons: Hit & Run was simply "Simpsons", as referenced by the executable file of the game. They also decided to add an exploration element to the game to make players get out of the car and navigate the area on foot, so that the game offered a better experience of Springfield. 

When developing the graphics, the team decided to include landmarks from Springfield. The player is able to enter some of them, including the Kwik-E-Mart, Moe's Tavern, Springfield Elementary School, and The Android's Dungeon and Baseball Card Shop. During Hit & Runs development, 20th Century Fox, Gracie Films and Matt Groening, the creator of The Simpsons, played important roles in bringing The Simpsons universe into a 3D environment. All character voices were supplied by the actual cast, and the series' writers wrote the entire story for the game, including dialogue. Voice samples original to the game, as well as one-liners from the show, can be heard in Hit & Run. Some of the dialogue from Road Rage was reused. Tim Ramage, the associate producer of the game's publisher, Vivendi Universal Games, considered it a blessing to have the opportunity of working with The Simpsons cast, along with the writers, with Ramage saying "...you have no concerns about quality; you know you’re getting the best there is."

The game's soundtrack was primarily composed by Marc Baril, with additional compositions by Jeff Tymoschuk and Allan Levy. The soundtrack includes various arrangements of the original Simpsons theme by Danny Elfman, and features specific melodies for each playable character; for example, Bart's gameplay is accompanied by hard rock, while Lisa has laid-back motifs that Steven Hopper of GameZone compared to beach party films.

Reception

Over one million copies of the game were sold as of June 2004, and three million as of July 2007. It had sold 500,000 copies in the United Kingdom by January 2004. The game's PlayStation 2 version received a "Diamond" sales award from the Entertainment and Leisure Software Publishers Association (ELSPA), indicating sales of at least 1 million copies in the United Kingdom.

Hit & Run received "generally favorable" reviews on all platforms according to the review aggregation website Metacritic, and many consider it to be the best Simpsons game to date. Praise focused on the move from the Simpsons television series to the video game format, while criticism targeted some aspects of gameplay. Hit & Run won the award for Fave Video Game at the 2004 Nickelodeon Kids' Choice Awards.

A number of reviews complimented the transposition of the Simpsons television series to a video game. Justin Leeper of Game Informer and Alex Navarro of GameSpot commented on how well the game depicted the fictional city of Springfield from the television series, and called it the most accurate representation of Springfield ever put into a game. Official Xbox Magazine said that the game did the show justice, and Play felt that it was "essentially the show in real time", summing up its review by calling the game a "truly great cross-over product". Navarro thought that the humor that the game offered included many excellent self-referential jokes, and Eric Bush of TeamXbox concluded its review by predicting that the game would be extremely appealing to gamers, especially hardcore Simpsons fans. Entertainment magazine Variety surmised that Hit & Run was the first Simpsons game to include humor comparable to what was in the television series.

Hit & Runs parodical take on the Grand Theft Auto III video game was praised by several reviewers. Zach Meston of GameSpy considered it to "deftly satirize Grand Theft Auto while being almost as entertaining", and suggested that Hit & Run improved several gameplay aspects that it borrowed from Grand Theft Auto, including instant mission restarts, a superior guidance system, and an easily accessible collection of vehicles. Official Xbox Magazine agreed that Hit & Run was an excellent game in its own right, and found the game to be a "brilliant" clone of Grand Theft Auto. The combination of the Simpsons universe with the gameplay of the Grand Theft Auto series was also praised by Douglass C. Perry of IGN as "pure brilliance".

Positive reviews of Hit & Run focused on its graphics and gameplay. Play appreciated the virtual world that the game offered, describing it as "grandiose in its expanse and artistic rendering". Navarro found the gameplay to be very engaging. Meston found the game to be "very fun and very funny", and Leeper called it "nothing short of astonishing". Despite positive reactions, the game also had serious issues that were brought up in several reviews, which focused on the game's bugs and glitches. Both Bush and Mr. Tickle of Game Revolution pointed out that Hit & Run had a few gameplay issues and graphical shortcomings that included strange artificial intelligence behavior and a broken camera system, which they felt hindered the overall experience of the game.

Non-video game publications gave positive reception on the game as well. Nick Catucci of The Village Voice gave the Xbox version a score of nine out of ten and stated, "This delightful, deep, and detailed (but unfortunately not cartoon-style cel-shaded) rip on the Grand Theft Auto series critiques itself better than any untenured academic could." Marc Saltzman of The Cincinnati Enquirer gave the game four stars out of five and said that "What it lacks in originality it more than makes up for with its fun and easy-to-pick-up game play that will appeal to fans of the long-running comedy." Geoff Keighley of Entertainment Weekly gave it a B and said, "If some of the missions seem repetitive, others stand out, like the one that has you confiscating copies of a particularly violent videogame (wink, wink) corrupting Springfield's youth." In Japan, Famitsu gave the Xbox version a score of two eights, one seven, and one eight, for a total of 31 out of 40.

Future
In March 2023, a designer of the game stated that he would "love" to see a modern remake of Hit & Run.

Notes

References

External links

 
 

2003 video games
Action-adventure games
Alien invasions in video games
Fox Interactive games
GameCube games
Metafictional video games
Multiplayer and single-player video games
PlayStation 2 games
Radical Entertainment games
Hit and Run
Video games developed in Canada
Video games scored by Jeff Tymoschuk
Video games set in the United States
Video games about zombies
Windows games
Xbox games
Video games scored by Marc Baril
Video games featuring female protagonists